Keith B. Walker (born December 28, 1958) is the former college men's basketball head coach for Delaware State University. He became interim head coach after previous coach Greg Jackson was fired January 30. Walker was named full head coach on April 15, 2014. He was fired from Delaware State on February 22, 2018.

Div I head coaching record

References

Living people
American men's basketball coaches
Clemson Tigers men's basketball players
College men's basketball head coaches in the United States
Delaware State Hornets men's basketball coaches
IUP Crimson Hawks men's basketball coaches
Shaw Bears men's basketball coaches
1958 births
American men's basketball players